Makapiling Kang Muli (International title: Together Again / ) is a 2012 Philippine television drama romance series broadcast by GMA Network. Directed by Ricky Davao, it stars Richard Gutierrez and Carla Abellana. It premiered on June 4, 2012 on the network's Telebabad line up replacing Legacy. The series concluded on September 7, 2012 with a total of 70 episodes. It was replaced by Aso ni San Roque in its timeslot.

It was originally titled as Rancho Paradiso.

Cast and characters

Lead cast
 Richard Gutierrez as Martín Caballero-De La Rosa-Silvestre
 Carla Abellana as Leilani Angeles

Supporting cast
 Mark Anthony Fernandez as Luisito "Louie" Valencia
 Sarah Lahbati as Graciela Montes
 Gloria Romero as Soledad Vda. de Silvestre-Caballero
 Rio Locsin as Mara Silvestre-Valencia
 Phillip Salvador as Amadeo Perez
 Mark Gil as Roman Valencia
 Robert Arevalo as Florentino "Tino" Caballero
 TJ Trinidad as Javier Lagdameo
 John Lapus as George
 Janine Gutierrez as Lynley Valencia
 Benedict Campos as Keiffer Angeles

Guest cast
 Lance Lucido as kid Martin Caballero
 Miguel Tanfelix as young Martin Caballero
 Anna Vicente as young Leilani Angeles
 Ronald de Santos as young Luisito "Louie" Valencia
 Jennylyn Mercado as young Mara Silvestre-Valencia
 Gabby Eigenmann as young Roman Valencia
 Jestoni Alarcon as Serafín Angeles
 Lani Mercado as Nelia Angeles
 James Blanco as Emilio dela Rosa
 Dex Quindoza as Buboy
 Carmen Soriano as Claring Perez
 Lito Legaspi as a governor
 Bearwin Meily as Dexter
 Rita Avila as Olivia
 Yassi Pressman as Vanessa
 Rocco Nacino as Ferdinand
 Rocky Gutierrez as Brando
 Ramon Christopher as Bartolome
 Bela Padilla as Amber
 Paolo Paraiso as Bodjie 
 Vaness del Moral as Salve
 Rosemarie Sarita as George's mother
 Carmi Martin as Helga
 Nathalie Hart as Monina
 Lester Llansang as Hans
 Andrew Schimmer as Kyle Dancel
 Marc Justine Alvarez as Macmac
 Sheree Bautista as Ara
 Mike Lloren as Rodriguez
 Robert Ortega as Durano

Production
The producer of the show hires the veteran and award-winning actor/director, Ricky Davao to handle the series. This television series is also Davao's second primetime directorial project under GMA Network. Prior to this series, Davao has been megged a string of shows in quick succession: Grazilda [as second unit director] (2010), Sisid (2011), Kung Aagawin Mo ang Langit (2011) and Kokak (2011).
Davao is confident that the series can establish supremacy on primetime television as it boasts quality in terms of story and performance. He further stated:

Casting
The series' producer cast two of the network's primetime royalties, Richard Gutierrez and Carla Abellana as Martin Caballero and Leilani Angeles, respectively, the two main protagonists of the series. The former expresses his gratitude on doing this project. For him, this drama is one of the biggest milestones in his career and a "something new" for him [the actor is associated with his top-rated fantasy-adventure series like Mulawin, Sugo, Captain Barbell, Lupin, Kamandag and Zorro] and for the audience. According to Gutierrez, the entire casts prepared hard for this project and even underwent trainings and workshops before shooting the series. On the other hand, Abellana expresses excitement as she embarks on a major project after renewing her contract with her mother network and working with Gutierrez [for the very first time] and some of the most respected stars in the industry. She also differentiates herself to her character, stated that... her character's personality was a far cry from her own. It made it more difficult for her to flesh out the persona of a woman who fights back and snaps in anger when wronged, because those aren't knee-jerk reactions for her in real life. However, she work hard to portray the role, as she doesn't want to embarrass her co-stars.

Meanwhile, veteran and award-winning actress, Gloria Romero plays the main villainess, Señora Soledad Silvestre. It is her first time to do an "anti-hero" role, and said that the role is very different from her goody-good role in the successful and highly rated drama series Munting Heredera, whom she recently completed. She stated... "When they gave me the role as Senyora Soledad, I immediately liked it! It is far from other roles I did in my past television series. I said, yes [to them] quickly! It is a huge challenge for me. I love these kind of roles", she added.

Comedian John Lapus plays support to Gutierrez, which he doesn't really mind even after recently receiving his second Actor of the Year award from the Guillermo Mendoza Scholarship Foundation [2012]. He further stated:

On director Ricky Davao, it is his first time to direct most of the lead stars of the series except for Sarah Lahbati, whom he previously handled in the afternoon drama-fantasy series, Kokak. Here, however, Lahbati is portraying someone totally different from her shy-girl screen persona. She's now playing an assertive seductress who tries to steal Gutierrez's character away from his leading lady [Abellana]. Davao added... "The good thing about Sarah is that she knows what she wants. And she works hard."

On his strategy in handling big stars like Gutierrez and Abellana, the director said that he just talk to them and get to know their likes, dislikes, fears, limitations, strengths and weaknesses as actors. He further stated that he is impressed by Abellana's growth as an actress. He worked with her as co-star in the afternoon soap Kung Aagawin Mo Ang Langit. "She has matured a lot from her first soap, Rosalinda", he added.

Filming
The series is set on the sweeping acres of a rustic ranch fictionally called "Rancho Paradiso", but which in reality is a huge hacienda in Calatagan, Batangas owned by the prominent Zobel clan, as well as, the well-trained polo horses are owned by the Zobels. The main protagonist of the series, Richard Gutierrez explained the production's choice of location, said that... "Our story revolves around supposedly one of the biggest ranches in the Philippines. And I guess this baluarte of the Zobels is one of the biggest haciendas we have, so it's a perfect match". The production started taping on May 7, 2012 with the series' creator, Des Garbes Severino, who also served as the head writer, creative director, Jun Lana,  Michele Borja as the executive producer of the show, and Lilybeth Rasonable headed as the over-all in charge of the production.

Music
The song "Hanggang Ngayon" (lit. Until Now) is used as the series' theme song. It was written and composed by award-winning singer/songwriter Ogie Alcasid, re-arranged by Edward Mitra for the show, and interpreted by Mark Bautista and Kyla.  The song's lyrics tell of a person confessing his/her unrequited love for his/her past flame and wishing for another chance of love.

The show uses three versions of the song: the duet version, the male solo and the female solo [both done in acoustic style] versions, also performed by Mark and Kyla.

Originally sung by Ogie Alcasid and Regine Velasquez in 2001 as part of Alcasid's album A Better Man, it was also used as soundtrack of the 2002 romantic flick Ikaw Lamang, Hanggang Ngayon (lit. Still You, Until Now) which starred Velasquez opposite Richard Gomez. The said film was directed by Yam Laranas and produced and released by Viva Films.

The song is also part of Alcasid's Greatest Hits album and Velasquez's silver anniversary album, entitled Regine, Duets Silver Series, released on 2005 and 2006 respectively, by VIVA Records. In 2006, GMA also used the Alcasid-Velasquez version of the song as the theme for the Philippine airing of the Korean drama series, Love Story in Harvard.

Reception

Ratings
According to AGB Nielsen Philippines' Mega Manila household television ratings, the pilot episode of Makapiling Kang Muli earned a 24% rating. While the final episode scored a 24.8% rating.

Critical response
Blog writer, Nestor Silvestre complimented the series on its high production value and the ensemble's acting. "The scenes in the Jailhouse with Richard were also beyond my expectations, they effortlessly pulled off fight scenes, dangerous motorcycle stunts, bombings and blasting and most especially the camera shots really gave me the feeling that I was like in a movie house watching a legit action film"...he stated.

Accolades

References

External links
 

2012 Philippine television series debuts
2012 Philippine television series endings
Filipino-language television shows
GMA Network drama series
Philippine romance television series
Television shows set in the Philippines